The 2020–21 season is Bohemians' 28th season in the Czech First League. The team is competing in Czech First League, the Czech Cup. The season is period from 1 July 2020 until 30 June 2021.

First team squad
.

Kits

Management team

Transfers

In

Out

New contracts

Pre-season

Friendly match

Competitions

Czech First League

Regular season

Results summary

Results by round

League table

Results

Czech Cup

Results

Statistics

Appearances and goals

|}

Goal scorers

Assists

Clean sheets

References

External links
Official website

Bohemians 1905 seasons
Bohemians 1905